Vinny Arora Dhoopar ( Arora; born 28 June 1991) is an Indian television actress. She started her acting career with Kasturi. She later appeared in Kuchh Is Tara and Aathvaan Vachan. She went on to portray prominent roles in shows like Maat Pitaah Ke Charnon Mein Swarg, Shubh Vivah and Itna Karo Na Mujhe Pyaar. She was last seen playing Juhi Sethi in Colors TV's Laado – Veerpur Ki Mardani.

Personal life
Arora married actor Dheeraj Dhoopar on 16 November 2016 in Delhi. They first met on the sets of Maat Pitaah Ke Charnon Mein Swarg in 2009. In April 2022, they announced that they were expecting their first child. On 10 August 2022, the couple had their first child, a boy.

Career
Arora started working at a very young age. Her first appearance on television was at the age of 16. She has bagged most of the notable roles till date. She has been part of many entertainment channels like Star Plus, Sony TV, Colors TV and Life OK. She was seen in Yeh Hai Aashiqui on Bindass for an episode The Other Mummy as Sachi. Apart from TV soaps, Arora also appeared on a TV commercial for Sonata Watches Wedding Collection in 2015. She played the role of Asha, a teacher in the award-winning film Dhanak in 2016. She was last seen playing the role of Juhi Sethi in Laado – Veerpur Ki Mardani on Colors TV and Surbhi in the web series Pati Patni Aur Woh.

Filmography

Television

Films

Web series

See also
List of Indian television actresses

References

External links

1991 births
Living people
Indian television actresses
Indian soap opera actresses
People from Delhi